National Tertiary Route 604, or just Route 604 (or ) is a National Road Route of Costa Rica, located in the Puntarenas province.

Description
In Puntarenas province, the route covers Puntarenas canton (Puntarenas, Pitahaya districts), Montes de Oro canton (San Isidro district).

References

Highways in Costa Rica